Superstar K 2016 is the eighth season of the South Korean television talent show series Superstar K, which premiered on 22 September 2016 on Mnet and aired Thursday nights at 9:40PM KST. Eliminations are determined in every episode, based on text message votes and online votes that are open to the entire public. The winner of Superstar K 2016, Kim Young-geun, won 500,000,000 won (US$470,990). This was the last season of the show to be produced, due to much lower viewership ratings than in past seasons. Kim Bum-soo returned as a judge. This season saw the addition of Gummy, Gil Seong-joon, Kim Yeon-woo, Brave Brothers, Ailee, and Han Sung-ho. This was the largest lineup of judges in the show's history, totaling 7. 

This is the first season to be produced by Signal Entertainment Group for Mnet due to the 2 billion won contract between the former and Mnet's owners CJ E&M in May 2016. Signal was the production company behind the Mnet programs Produce 101 and I Can See Your Voice.

Broadcasting time

Broadcast

Finalists

TOP 10 
 Jinwon (ko)
 Jo Min Wook
 Corona
 Lee Ji Eun
 Lee Sarah 
 Yoo Da Bin
 Park Hye-won
 Kim Ye Sung
 Dong  Woo Seok
 Kim Young Geun

Elimination chart

Finals

TOP 10 - First Stage (November 17, 2016)
 Judges Score 50% + Population Votes 40% + Online Pre Votes 10%

Performance

Results

TOP 7 - Judge's Mission (November 24, 2016)
Judges Score 50% + SMS Votes 45% + Online Pre Votes 5%

Performance

Results

TOP 4 - My Style by Kim Gun-mo (December 1, 2016)
Judges Score 50% + SMS Votes 45% + Online Pre Votes 5%

Performance 

 TOP4 Special Stage: Jo Min Wook + Kim Young Geun + Lee Ji Eun + Park Hye Won : "Park Gwang-hyun and Kim Gun-mo - Together"

Results

FINAL (December 8, 2016)
Judges Score 50% + SMS Votes 45% + Online Pre Votes 5%

Performance 

 TOP2 Special Stage: Kim Young Geun + Lee Ji Eun : "Lee Moon-se - Farewell My Love"
 TOP10&Kim Bum-soo&Kim Yeon-woo Special Stage: Jinwon + Jo Min Wook + Corona + Lee Ji Eun + Lee Sarah + Yoo Da Bin + Park Hye Won + Kim Ye Sung + Dong Woo Seok + Kim Young Geun + Kim Bum-soo + Kim Yeon-woo : "NOW N NEW Various Artists - 하나되어"

Results

Discography

Ratings 

References

External links

Naver

2016 South Korean television seasons
8